The Johnstown Flood National Memorial is a unit of the United States National Park Service. Established in 1964 through legislation signed by President Lyndon B. Johnson, it pays tribute to the thousands of victims of the Johnstown Flood, who were injured or killed on May 31, 1889 when the South Fork Dam ruptured.

History

History of the Johnstown Flood
Founded in 1800, Johnstown was a steel town that grew from the development of the Pennsylvania Railroad and other transportation services in Cambria County. The town had a population of thirty thousand people who were of mostly German and Welsh ancestry. Established in the center of a floodplain between Little Conemaugh and Stony Creek rivers, the community was surrounded, during the latter part of the nineteenth century, by land that had been devastated by deforestation and the leveling of hills, both of which were responsible for periodic floods.

In 1836, the South Fork dam was built at Conemaugh Lake to create a reservoir for the Pennsylvania Canal's western division. Measuring eight hundred and fifty feet at its breast section, the dam was made of earth and stone, and was reported to be the largest dam of its type in the world at the time of its construction. Subsequently abandoned by the canal system, it was purchased by the South Fork Fishing and Hunting Club, a recreational group composed of wealthy individuals from the Pittsburgh region who subsequently paid for repairs to the dam and additional construction which raised its height in order to transform the area into a boating and fishing resort community.

On May 31, 1889, the South Fork dam broke from the weight of combined heavy rains and a sudden freshet that had caused a significantly higher amount of water to accumulate in its reservoir than normal. The dam's rupture released twenty million tons of water, which traveled at forty miles per hour, creating a seventy-foot-high wall of water that was propelled fourteen miles downward into the Little Conemaugh River Valley, where it flooded Johnstown. Property, industry, homes, farms, and lives were destroyed as the water, debris, oil, and bodies of flood victims were caught in the arches of a Pennsylvania Railroad-owned stone bridge. Eighty of the trapped people subsequently died in a related fire.

Although the flood lasted for just ten minutes, the catastrophic damage it caused required five years of cleanup and rebuilding to enable residents of Johnstown to recover. In addition to the thousands of initial injuries and lives lost, the community was also impacted by an outbreak of typhoid fever, which developed from bacteria-tainted flood waters, causing forty additional deaths. Surviving residents were treated and cared for by relief corps from several cities in Southwestern Pennsylvania. The federal government and foreign countries also responded with more than $3.7 million in money, food, and clothing for the town.

Just sixteen when the flood happened, survivor Victor Heiser gave his recollection of the event years later during a recording of his oral history. He remembered people living in the area near the dam often saying beforehand, "That dam will give way, but it won’t ever happen to us," and also recalled that the flood, when it hit, was like a "huge wall" coming down the street. The longest living survivor of the flood, Frank Shomo, died March 20, 1997, at the age of one hundred and eight.

History of the memorial
As a result of legislation proposed by U.S. Congressman John P. Saylor, H.R. 931, which was supported by the Blair County Historical Society and the Pennsylvania Historical and Museum Commission, creation of this memorial was approved by the United States Congress on August 31, 1964. Signed into law by U.S. President Lyndon B. Johnson on September 2, 1964, the Johnstown Flood National Memorial was officially established to preserve the remains of the South Fork Dam, which was structurally lacking at the time of its rupture during the Johnstown Flood on May 31, 1889. Also conserved by this legislation were the former Lake Conemaugh bed, along with the farm of Elias Unger and the clubhouse of the South Fork Fishing and Hunting Club, which owned the dam and reservoir.

The memorial is presently located at 733 Lake Road near South Fork, Pennsylvania, about 10 miles (16 km) northeast of Johnstown, Pennsylvania.

Park features
The visitor center at this national memorial offers two floors of exhibits with maps, views of the former dam, tactile displays, historic photographs of the South Fork Fishing and Hunting Club, a reproduction morgue book, the oral history of flood survivor Victor Heiser, and the film, "Black Friday," and also includes the Unger House and the Springhouse.

Visitors to the national memorial may also explore the South Fork Fishing and Hunting Clubhouse, which was acquired by the park in 2006, and the Lake View Visitor Center. Ranger-interpreted and van-guided tours are also both available.

Hiking trails connect various parts of the memorial, and picnicking areas are also present throughout.

Lakebed Rehabilitation Project
On January, 2020, the Lakebed Rehabilitation Project began at the Johnston Flood National Memorial. The project's goal was to restore the view of how the lakebed looked before the breakage of the dam in 1889. Vegetation has grown in the area so the National Park Service Wildland Fire and Aviation staff cleared it using a masticator machine. This caused problems however as there are many places that both man and machine cannot clear with safety. An organization named Allegheny Goatscape from Pittsburgh used their services of 12 goats and a donkey to provide assistance in clearing the area. The herd is able to eat an approximate of an acre of vegetation every two weeks. Another organization named Russell Tree Experts from Ohio also assisted in mechanical clearing of the lakebed. This clearing project is expected to continue till the summer of 2021.

Gallery

See also
 List of national memorials of the United States
 South Fork Fishing and Hunting Club
 Johnstown flood of 1936
 Johnstown flood of 1977
 St. Francis Dam disaster
 Vajont Dam disaster

References

 The National Parks: Index 2001–2003. Washington: U.S. Department of the Interior.

External links

 Official NPS website: Johnstown Flood National Memorial
 Run for Your Lives!: The Johnstown Flood of 1889, a National Park Service Teaching with Historic Places (TwHP) lesson plan (archive)

Monuments and memorials on the National Register of Historic Places in Pennsylvania
National Memorials of the United States
Museums in Cambria County, Pennsylvania
History museums in Pennsylvania
Protected areas established in 1964
National Park Service areas in Pennsylvania
Protected areas of Cambria County, Pennsylvania
Monuments and memorials in Pennsylvania
1964 establishments in Pennsylvania
National Register of Historic Places in Cambria County, Pennsylvania